SS Thomas B. King was a Liberty ship built in the United States during World War II. She was named after Thomas B. King, a United States representative from Georgia.

Construction
Thomas B. King was laid down on 23 June 1944, under a Maritime Commission (MARCOM) contract, MC hull 2369, by J.A. Jones Construction, Brunswick, Georgia; she was sponsored by Mrs. Franklin D. Aikens, and launched on 7 August 1944.

History
She was allocated to Wessel Duval & Company, on 19 August 1944. On 8 June 1950, she was laid up in the National Defense Reserve Fleet in Wilmington, North Carolina. On 19 June 1953, she was withdrawn from the fleet to be loaded with grain under the "Grain Program 1953", she relocated to the Hudson River Reserve Fleet, loaded with grain on 29 June 1953. She was  withdrawn from the fleet on 11 April 1956, to have the grain unloaded and returned empty on 18 April 1956. On 8 August 1956, she was withdrawn from the fleet to be loaded with grain under the "Grain Program 1956", she returned loaded with grain on 23 August 1956. She was withdrawn from the fleet on 18 March 1961, to have the grain unloaded and returned empty on 26 March 1961. On 5 August 1961, she was withdrawn from the fleet to be loaded with grain under the "Grain Program 1961", she returned loaded with grain on 17 August 1961. She was withdrawn from the fleet on 7 August 1963, to have the grain unloaded and returned empty on 12 August 1963. On 15 May 1970, she was sold for scrapping to Union Minerals & Alloys Co. She was removed from the fleet on 9 July 1970.

References

Bibliography

 
 
 
 
 

 

Liberty ships
Ships built in Brunswick, Georgia
1944 ships
Wilmington Reserve Fleet
Hudson River Reserve Fleet
Hudson River Reserve Fleet Grain Program